The Mulwala Football Club, nicknamed the Lions, is an Australian rules football and netball club based in the town of Mulwala located in the Riverina district of New South Wales.

The first recorded match was Mulwala verses Murray Football Club on Saturday, 23 September 1882.

Between 1883 and 1886 a Selector's Union Football Club played their home games in Mulwala and played against Corowa and Border United for the Camplin Cup.

In 1894, the Tungamah Caladonian Society donated 20 medals to be competed for by the following football teams – Burramine South, Mulwala, Tungamah, Yarrawonga and Youarang. 

In 1898 Mulwala FC competed in the Yarrawonga & District Football Association against – Burramine South, Bundalong, Katamatite, Telford and Yarrawonga.

In 1902, Mulwala were runners up to St. James / Devenish United Football Club in the Yarrawonga and Border Football Association.

Mulwala were runners up to Rennie in the 1939 and 1940 Coreen & District Football League grand final.

In 1948, Burramine defeated Mulwala by one point to win the premiership of the Murray Valley North East Football League.

Mulwala have competed in the Murray FNL, in both football and netball since 1987.

League competitions timeline
Tungamah Caledonian Society Football Competition
1894
Yarrawonga District Football Association 
1898–1919; 
Benalla Mulwala Football League  
1920–1937; 
Coreen & District Football League
1938–1940;
Mulwala Football Club
1941–1945 Club in recess, due to World War II 
Murray Valley North-East Football League  
1946–1948; 
Benalla Tungamah Football League
1949–1966
Tungamah Football League
1967–1986
Murray Football League
1987 to present day

Premierships
Senior Football
 Yarrawonga & Border Football Association (1):
 1912 
 Murray Valley Football League (1):
 1950 
 Tungamah Football League (3):
 1959, 1968, 1969
 Murray Football League (2): 
 1990, 2022

Football League – Best and Fairest Winners
Seniors
Benalla Tungamah Football League
 1955 – Les Squires 

Tungamah Football League
 1977 – B Cooper

Murray Football League
1987 – Phillip Beams
1999 – Robert Lamberti
2001 – Robert Lamberti
2005 – Jason Sanderson
2019 – Jackson Gash

Mulwala FC players who played in the VFL / AFL
The following players played with Mulwala, prior to playing senior football in the VFL, with the year indicating their VFL debut.
 1927 – Frank Seymour – Carlton & Fitzroy
 1974 – Dennis Payne – Melbourne
 2002 – Mark McGough – Collingwood & St. Kilda

References

External links
 Facebook page
 Instagram site
 SportsTG site

Murray Football League clubs
Mulwala, New South Wales
Netball teams in New South Wales
Australian rules football clubs in New South Wales